The Women's Downhill competition of the Sarajevo 1984 Olympics was held at Jahorina on Thursday, February 16. It was the tenth edition of the event, which was established in 1948. 

The defending world champion was Gerry Sorensen of Canada, while Switzerland's Doris De Agostini was the defending World Cup downhill champion and Switzerland's Maria Walliser led the current season. Defending Olympic champion Annemarie Moser-Pröll and De Agostini had both retired from competition.

The race was delayed five days, due to weather and scheduling conflicts. Switzerland's Michela Figini won the gold medal, followed by teammate Walliser, and Olga Charvátová of Czechoslovakia was the bronze medalist.

The men's downhill, delayed a full week, was run the same day at Bjelašnica, and started at noon.

Results
The race was started at 10:30 local time, (UTC+1).

References 

 

Women's downhill
Oly
Alp